The Kavishwar Dalpatram Award (Gujarati: કવિશ્વર દલપતરામ ઍવોર્ડ) is a literary honour in Gujarat, India given by Vardhman Vikas Seva Trust, Wadhwan. The award is conferred annually to the Gujarati language poet for his significant contribution in Gujarati poetry since 2010. Founded by Vardhman Vikas Trust, the award is named after renowned Gujarati language poet Dalpatram. The award comprises shield, showl and the cash prize of Rs. 25000.

Recipients 
The Kavishwar Dalpatram Award has been granted annually since 2010 to the following people:

References

Awards established in 2010
Gujarati literary awards
2010 establishments in Gujarat